Oelwein is a city in Fayette County, Iowa, United States. The population was 5,920 at the time of the 2020 census, a decrease of 11.5% from the 2000 census. The largest community in Fayette County, it is located at the junction of State Highways 3 and 150.

History 
The town of Oelwein was laid out in a corn field purchased from pioneer settler Gustav Oelwein on the coming of the Burlington, Cedar Rapids and Minnesota Railroad (later called the Rock Island) in 1872. Some years later the two dividing streets of Oelwein were named after his sons, Frederick and Charles.

Oelwein's present site was entered in 1852 by J. B. Burch.  The hamlet of Oelwein was instituted  in 1873, and was incorporated as a town in 1888, with Dr. Israel Pattison  becoming its first mayor. The town suffered its chief setback in 1887, when nearly all of the old Main Street business district (now First Avenue SE) was destroyed by fire. In 1890 the census gave the population as 830.

By January 1892, Oelwein was chosen to become the center of the Chicago Great Western Railway; the CGW made the town the site of their locomotive and car repair shop. Clearing the land for the shops began in June 1894. The shops were completed and put into operation in May 1899. Thus, Oelwein became known as the "Shop City" and later the "Hub City" because of the rail lines coming into town and the repair shops located here.

By 1895 the population had increased to 1,928, and in 1897 Oelwein was incorporated as a city. In 1900, Oelwein had 5,142 people within the city limits, of whom 789 were foreign-born. Oelwein was one of few Iowa towns to experience an influx of Italian immigrants who were employed in the railroad industry. In 1910, the population was 6,028, and in 1940, 7,801.

In 1968, the town suffered another setback when a tornado swept through the main business district. 68 homes were destroyed, including some in F5 damage, 132 sustained major damage and 600 sustained less damage. Every business in the district suffered damage including 51 that were destroyed. Two churches, an elementary school, and the middle school were destroyed. Extensive damage was also done in nearby Maynard. Along the path, 5 people died (one in Oelwein), 156 were injured, and $21 million worth of ($18 million in Oelwein) damage was done, inflated to $130.4 million today.

Oelwein remained a "railroad town" until the early 1980s when most of the railroad tracks to the East, North and then West directions were abandoned. Transco Railway Products exists in Oelwein today. That business employs about 70 people repairing railroad cars. Transco employees donated their time to refurbish a Chicago Great Western EMD FP7 diesel locomotive that is displayed near the Hub City Heritage Museum, 26 2nd Avenue SW, the museum of railroad memorabilia.

Methland controversy

The 2009 book Methland: The Death and Life of an American Small Town by Nick Reding (Bloomsbury Press) documents the drug culture and how it ties into larger issues of rural flight and small town economic decline placed in the historic context of the drug trade. While Reding's book received positive reviews from the New York Times Sunday Book Review and Washington Post's Book World, it was severely criticised by local columnist Laura Behrens, who wrote, "it is so ridden with errors of basic reporting that the credibility of its larger premises is crippled", pointing out several factual errors.

Geography
Oelwein's latitude and longitude coordinates in decimal form are 42.676996, −91.915745.

Demographics

2010 census
At the 2010 census there were 6,415 people in 2,763 households, including 1,678 families, in the city. The racial makup of the city was 96.1% White, 0.9% African American, 0.1% Native American, 0.6% Asian, 0.1% Pacific Islander, 0.6% from other races, and 1.6% from two or more races. Hispanic or Latino of any race were 2.9%.

Of the 2,763 households 27.5% had children under the age of 18 living with them, 44.3% were married couples living together, 11.5% had a female householder with no husband present, 5.0% had a male householder with no wife present, and 39.3% were non-families. 33.9% of households were one person and 17.1% were one person aged 65 or older. The average household size was 2.26 and the average family size was 2.85.

The median age was 42.9 years. 23.1% of residents were under the age of 18; 7.6% were between the ages of 18 and 24; 21.9% were from 25 to 44; 26.3% were from 45 to 64; and 21.2% were 65 or older. The gender makeup of the city was 47.6% male and 52.4% female.

2000 census
At the 2000 census there were 6,692 people in 2,808 households, including 1,819 families, in the city. The racial makup of the city was 97.19% White, 0.42% African American, 0.19% Native American, 0.40% Asian, 0.06% Pacific Islander, 0.64% from other races, and 1.09% from two or more races. Hispanic or Latino of any race were 2.29%.

Of the 2,808 households 28.8% had children under the age of 18 living with them, 50.0% were married couples living together, 10.9% had a female householder with no husband present, and 35.2% were non-families. 31.1% of households were one person and 17.5% were one person aged 65 or older. The average household size was 2.31 and the average family size was 2.87.

Age spread: 24.4% under the age of 18, 7.4% from 18 to 24, 24.3% from 25 to 44, 21.2% from 45 to 64, and 22.7% 65 or older. The median age was 41 years. For every 100 females, there were 86.8 males. For every 100 females age 18 and over, there were 82.8 males.

The median household income was $27,347 and the median family income  was $32,279. Males had a median income of $28,075 versus $19,479 for females. The per capita income for the city was $17,502. About 11.7% of families and 13.7% of the population were below the poverty line, including 19.4% of those under age 18 and 13.7% of those age 65 or over.

Arts and culture 
The Williams Center for the Performing Arts is a modern auditorium with seating for 800. Performers include frequent visits from regional and national performers as well as local talent.

Parks and recreation 
Recreational opportunities include public parks, campgrounds, children's playgrounds, and picnic areas. Canoeing, boating and swimming are available at City Park. A paved hiking/biking trail is being extended to connect all parks in town. Tennis courts, a skateboard rink, and softball diamonds are at Wings Park. One 9-hole golf course is available. A new ball field includes lighted fields for school games and will soon include soccer fields. In the winter, enjoy cross-country skiing, snowmobiling, and ice fishing.

Walter P. Chrysler Park
Size: . Located at North Frederick and 2nd Street, originally two small parks referred to as "Twin Parks" or "Gazebo Park". Dedicated to Walter P. Chrysler, who once resided in Oelwein, the part to the east offers a gazebo with picnic facilities, water fountain, flower gardens, and a planting of Thunderchild Flowering Crabapple Trees, received through an Arbor Day Challenge Grant and Oelwein Trees Forever. The second part holds the Korean and Vietnam Veterans Memorials, donated by the Robert McNamara family in 1998.

Orville Christophel Park
Size: . Located at 1st Avenue and 1st Street SW, this park is known as Orville Christophel Memorial or Log Cabin Park.  Most people believe it was Gustav Oelwein who built the cabin in the Orville Christophel Park, but he was not involved with the cabin. J.B Burch built the cabin in 1852 which still stands at the park today.  The park offers a historical monument from days of yore, picnic tables, benches, and parking for downtown shopping.

City Park
Size: . Located on South Frederick, this park is frontage property to a  artificial lake named Lake Oelwein. Modern playground equipment was installed with the help of the Kids Playground Fund.

The park offers picnic shelters with tables, open play area, tennis court, sand volleyball, horseshoe courts, restroom facilities, a dog park, modern and primitive camping, and a dump station. The lake offers "no wake" boating.

The campground overlooks Lake Oelwein and provides public boating access. Facilities include 30 modern RV sites, primitive campsites, private shower facilities, and dump station. For more information, call City Hall at 283-5440.

Levin Park
Size: . Located at 4th Avenue and 4½ Street SW, this park offers picnic tables, an open play field, and is bordered by a natural wooded environment. A bike/skateboard/walking trail accesses it on the west.

Platt's Park
Size: . Located at 7th Street and 7th Avenue SE, this park offers  of footpaths, picnic shelters and tables, playground equipment, horseshoe court, restrooms, and a large playfield. This park is the home of a Gazebo and "Trail of Dreams" created by Oelwein Care Center. New playground equipment was installed with the help of the Kids Playground Fund.

Redgate Park
Size: . Located on West Charles Street, this park offers a large wooded area, as well as picnic facilities, playground equipment, tennis court, horseshoe courts, restrooms and Bocce Ball courts. This park has new playground equipment installed by the Kids Playground Fund.

Reidy Park
Size: . Located at 2nd Street and Hillside Drive SE, this park offers a basketball court, playground equipment, picnic facilities, new and improved tennis courts, and new playground equipment installed by the Kids Playground Fund.

Wings Park
Size: . Located at 4th Street and 5th Avenue NE, Wings Park is the home of the Oelwein Family Aquatics Center. The park offers picnic shelters and tables, tennis courts, 3 softball fields, basketball court, horseshoe courts, restrooms, and playground equipment installed with the help of the Kids Playground Fund.

Great Western Park
Newest park in town, on northwest side, is a wildlife preserve.

Education 
The Oelwein Community School District operates public schools in the city. Children from Oelwein, Hazleton, and Stanley attend school there. The schools are listed as follows:
 Little Husky Learning Center – Kindergarten, preschool, and Head Start
 Wings Park Elementary – 1st–4th Grade
 Oelwein Middle School – 5th–8th Grade
 Oelwein High School – 9th–12th Grade

Sacred Heart School of the Roman Catholic Archdiocese of Dubuque is in Oelwein. The school was established in 1904 in its own building. By 2019 it sustained a decline in income and in the number of students and established a GoFundMe to stave off closure.  it has about 165 students.

In addition, Oelwein is also home to the Regional Academy for Math and Science (RAMS). RAMS is an educational facility that strengthens area high schools and serves college and adult learners through courses offered by Northeast Iowa Community College (NICC). RAMS provides a challenging curriculum for high school and college students and serves as a summer regional center for gifted and talented programs. RAMS also partners with the regent universities to offer summer coursework for teachers.

Notable people  

Maurice E. Baringer (1921-2011), Iowa State Treasurer and state representative
Walter Chrysler (1875–1940), founder of the Chrysler Corporation
Walter P. Chrysler Jr. (1909–1988), art collector and museum benefactor, president of Chrysler Building
Arthur T. Gibbons (1903-1986), Businessman and Minnesota state representative
Ray Hanken (1911–1980), football player
John Francis Kinney (1937-2019), former bishop of Bismarck and St. Cloud
Gustav Oelwein (1838-1913), town founder
Kermit Tyler (1913-2010), US Air Force pilot during the attack on Pearl Harbor
Dick Wagner (1942-2014), American rock music guitarist, songwriter and author

Other points of interest 

Oelwein Sports Complex
Size: . Located on 20th Street SE, this park offers two soccer fields, two softball/baseball fields, and the home baseball field of the Oelwein Huskies. The complex is restricted in use, for league play only at this time. Modern restrooms, concessions stand, and drinking fountains are available.

Oelwein Family Aquatics Center
Located at 411 4th Street NE, this facility offers a zero-depth entry pool,  water slide, 6 racing lanes, 1 and 3 meter diving boards, sunning deck & grass areas, modern changing facilities, playground facility, and concessions facility.

Williams Wellness Center
The Wellness Center is open 7 days a week. It features a variety of fitness and dance classes, circuit weight and cardiovascular equipment, a gymnasium and indoor track. Offerings also include Personal Training and Massage Therapy.

References

External links

 
City of Oelwein official website
Oelwein Chamber and Area Development
Historic
Panoramic Photograph from Library of Congress

Cities in Iowa
Cities in Fayette County, Iowa
1872 establishments in Iowa
Populated places established in 1872